The 2019 Women's Oceania Cup was the eleventh edition of the women's field hockey tournament. It was held from 5 to 8 September in Rockhampton.

The tournament served as a qualifier for the 2020 Summer Olympics.

New Zealand won the tournament for the fourth time, finishing ahead of Australia on goal difference.

Background
Australia were three-time back-to-back defending champions. The winners of the Cup earned an automatic place at the 2020 Olympic Games.

The hosting announcement of the Rockhampton Hockey Association came as $5 million was being invested into the hockey centre to upgrade the facilities. In March 2019, Stirling Hinchliffe, MLA for Sandgate and Minister for Local Government, Racing and Multicultural Affairs announced that the Government of Queensland had invested $2.5 million into the Kalka Shades, the home of the Rockhampton Hockey Association.

Teams

Head Coach: Paul Gaudoin

Sophie Taylor
Ambrosia Malone
Brooke Peris
Amy Lawton
Ashlee Wells (GK)
Jodie Kenny (C)
Lily Brazel
Madison Fitzpatrick
Edwina Bone
Kaitlin Nobbs
Georgina Morgan (C)
Jane Claxton
Renee Taylor
Kalindi Commerford
Mariah Williams
Emily Chalker (C)
Rachael Lynch (GK)
Savannah Fitzpatrick

Head Coach: Graham Shaw

Tarryn Davey
Olivia Shannon
Olivia Merry
Frances Davies
Amy Robinson
Sally Rutherford (GK)
Brooke Neal
Rachel McCann
Ella Gunson
Samantha Charlton
Grace O'Hanlon (GK)
Stephanie Dickins
Kirsten Pearce
Megan Hull
Rose Keddell
Holly Pearson
Stacey Michelsen (C)
Julia King

Results
All times are local (AEST).

Pool

Fixtures

Statistics

Final standings

Goalscorers

References

External links
International Hockey Federation

Women's Oceania Cup
Oceania Cup
International women's field hockey competitions hosted by Australia
Oceania Cup
Sport in Rockhampton
Oceania Cup